Zabrody may refer to the following places:
Zabrody, Podlaskie Voivodeship (north-east Poland)
Zabrody, Pomeranian Voivodeship
Zabrody, Gmina Karsin in Pomeranian Voivodeship (north Poland)
Zabrody, Świętokrzyskie Voivodeship (south-central Poland)
Zabrody, Ratne Raion (Ukraine)